There are regulations that aim to prevent and minimise the impact of the introduction and spread of Invasive species that are not native to Wales and England.

The Invasive Alien Species (Enforcement and Permitting) Order 2019 gives effect to EU regulations on the prevention and management of the spread of invasive alien species listing 66 species which are of special concern, of which 14 of these species are found in Wales and England.

Widely spread 
The 14 species that have been identified as being widely spread in both Wales and England, and thus requiring management are:

Animals

Plants

Non-widely spread

Animals

Plants

See also 
Introduced species of the British Isles

References 

Invasive animal species
Flora of England
Flora of Wales